Mussi is an Italian surname. Notable people with the surname include:

Camillo Mussi (1911–1940), Italian ice hockey player
Carolina Mussi (born 1988), Brazilian swimmer
Fabio Mussi (born 1948), Italian politician
Giuseppe Mussi (1836–1904), Italian politician
Mary Mussi, née Edgar (1907–1991), British writer, known as Mary Howard
Roberto Mussi (born 1963), Italian footballer

See also
Muzzi
Musi (disambiguation)

Italian-language surnames